Marat Akbarov (born February 3, 1961) is a former competitive pair skater for the Soviet Union. With Veronica Pershina, he is the 1985 European bronze medalist and 1979 World Junior champion.

Career 
Akbarov began skating in 1968 at the Lokomotiv Skating Club in Sverdlovsk (now Yekaterinburg) with coach Alexander Rogin. He teamed up with Veronica Pershina in 1975. The pair moved to Moscow in 1978 to train with Stanislav Zhuk. They won the World Junior title in 1979 ahead of Larisa Selezneva / Oleg Makarov.

In 1980, Pershina/Akbarov made their senior World Championship debut, placing 6th. The following season, they won the Soviet national title ahead of Irina Vorobieva / Igor Lisovski. The pair changed coaches to Irina Rodnina in 1982.

Pershina/Akbarov were gold medalists at the 1982 Prize of Moscow News and 1983 NHK Trophy. In 1985, they were sent to their fourth European Championships and won the bronze medal. They took silver at the Skate Canada International in their final season.

After retiring from competition, Akbarov performed with the Russian All Stars under the direction of Tatiana Tarasova, before becoming a coach. He coaches at the Wheaton Ice Skating Academy in Wheaton, Maryland.

Personal life 
Akbarov married fellow pair skater Marina Pestova, with whom he has a daughter, Angela.

Results
(with Pershina)

References 

Russian male pair skaters
Soviet male pair skaters
Living people
1961 births
European Figure Skating Championships medalists
World Junior Figure Skating Championships medalists
Sportspeople from Yekaterinburg
Russian figure skating coaches
People from Wheaton, Maryland